For the main article see Bavarian ice hockey leagues

The Bavarian ice hockey league season 2006-07 started on 20 October 2006 with the first round in the Bayernliga and finished on 23 March 2007 with the third league final. It saw the EHF Passau take out the Bavarian title. The EHF, along with the runner-up Deggendorfer SC were accepted into the Oberliga for the 2007-08 season.

No team remained undefeated all season or managed to suffer only one loss. Three clubs hold the joint record of two defeats only, those being the VER Selb, Wanderers Germaring and ESV Gebensbach. Also, three clubs remained winless all season, those being the EV Bruckberg, TSV Trostberg II and EC Pfaffenhofen II.

Champions
The three levels of the Bavarian league system were won by the following teams:

 Bayernliga: EHF Passau
 Landesliga: EHC Nürnberg
 Bezirksliga: ESV Gebensbach

Bayernliga
 The competition was played, as in the years previously, with 16 teams, with the top eight qualified for the championship play-off and the bottom eight having to play-down to determine the two relegated teams.

Final table

 (N) denotes team promoted from the Landesliga after the previous season.

Play-Offs
All rounds of the play-offs were carried out in a best-of-three modus. The winner of the final was crowned Bayrischer Meister (English:Bavarian champions).

First round

Semi finals

Finals
 Third place:

 Championship:

 The EHF Passau wins the Bavarian championship for the 2006-07 season.

Play-Downs
Both rounds were played in a best-of-three modus. The losing semi-finalists are relegated to the Landesligas.

First round

Semi finals

 The EV Pegnitz and SVG Burgkirchen are relegated to the Landesliga.

Top scorers

Main round

Play-Offs

Landesliga
The four regional divisions played out a home-and-away round to determined the top four clubs who entered the promotion round. The promotion round groups were mixed, with one club each from the four divisions. The bottom four entered a relegation round with the last club from there being relegated to the Bezirksliga.

The winner of each of the four promotion rounds entered the Landesliga finals. The two winners of the semi finals were promoted to the Bayernliga. Because two teams from the Bayernliga were promoted to the Oberliga and none relegated, an additional two promotion spots became available and in the end all four finalists were promoted.

First round
Top four teams enter the promotion round.
 Landesliga Nord

 Landesliga Süd

 Landesliga Ost
 The 4th place was decided on the results of the games between the two involved clubs, 4-3 and 3-3 in Straubings favor.

 Landesliga West
 The 4th place was decided on the results of the games between the two involved clubs, 5-0 and 2-5 in Burgaus favor.

 (R) denotes team relegated from the Bayernliga after previous season.
 (N) denotes team promoted from the Bezirksliga after previous season.

Promotion round
First placed team qualifies for the Landesliga championship.
 Group 1

 Group 2

 Group 3

 Group 4

Landesliga championship

Semi finals

Finals
 Third place:

 Championship:

 The EHC 80 Nürnberg is the Landesliga champion for the 2006-07 season. Together with the Wanderers Germering, EV Pfronten and VER Selb they are promoted to the Bayernliga.

Relegation round
The bottom team in each group is relegated to the Bezirksliga.
 Landesliga Nord
 The last place was decided on the results of the games between the two involved clubs, 10-5 and 4-7 in Stiftland-Mitterteich favor.

 Landesliga Süd

 Landesliga Ost

 Landesliga West
 The last place was decided on the results of the games between the two involved clubs, 10-3 and 3-5 in Kotterns favor. 

 The EC Bad Kissing and EV Bruckberg are relegated to the Bezirksliga. 
 The TSV Kottern withdraws from the Bavarian ice hockey leagues, its ice hockey department joins the new ESC Kempten.
 The DEC Frillensee-Inzell and ERC Lechbruck are not relegated because four Landesliga teams are promoted to the Bayernliga and therefore extra places in the Landesliga are available.

Bezirksliga
The four regional division played out a home-and-away round to determined the league winner. The four league champions are nominally promoted to the Landesliga and also are qualified for the Bezirksliga championship round.

Main round
First placed team enters championship round.
 Bezirksliga Nord

 Bezirksliga Süd
 The first place was decided on the results of the games between the two involved clubs, 5-2 and 4-4 in Geretsrieds favor

 Bezirksliga Ost

 Bezirksliga West

 (R) denotes team relegated from the Landesliga after previous season.
 (N) denotes team has newly entered the league system.

Championship round
The Bezirksliga championship was decided in a home-and-away round with the club with the best aggregate score taking out the series. Nominally, all four teams are already promoted to the Landesliga, however, the VfL Denklingen was not.

Semi finals

Final

 The ESV Gebensbach is the 2006-07 Bavarian Bezirksliga champion. The ESC Riverrats Geretsried and EHC Bayreuth are also promoted to the Landesliga.
 The ESV Würzburg and EHC Bad Aibling are also promoted.
 The VfL Denklingen was not promoted.

Sources
 Bayrischer Eissport Verband- Official Bavarian ice hockey website
 Hockey Archives - International ice hockey website with tables and results (in French)
 Bayernhockey-Inoffical website on Bavarian ice hockey

2006–07 in German ice hockey
2006